Gliophorus is a genus of agaric fungi in the family Hygrophoraceae. Gliophorus species belong to a group known as waxcaps in English, sometimes also waxy caps in North America or waxgills in New Zealand. In Europe, Gliophorus species are typical of waxcap grasslands, a declining habitat due to changing agricultural practices. As a result, two species, Gliophorus europerplexus and Gliophorus reginae, are of global conservation concern and are listed as "vulnerable" on the IUCN Red List of Threatened Species.

Taxonomy
The genus was described by Czech mycologist Josef Herink in 1958. It was formerly synonymized with Hygrocybe by many authorities, but recent molecular research, based on cladistic analysis of DNA sequences, indicates that Gliophorus is monophyletic and forms a natural group distinct from Hygrocybe sensu stricto.

Description
Species are distinguished from most other waxcaps by producing basidiocarps (fruit bodies) with extremely slimy or glutinous caps and stems. The waxcap genus Gloioxanthomyces is superficially similar.

Habitat and Distribution
In Europe, Gliophorus species are typically found in agriculturally unimproved, short-sward grasslands (including pastures and lawns). Elsewhere, they are most frequently found in woodland. The genus is cosmopolitan, though New Zealand has an unusually large number of native Gliophorus species.

Species

References

Hygrophoraceae
Agaricales genera
Taxa named by Josef Herink
Taxa described in 1958